Shukrallah, Shukralla or Shokrallah is an Arabic surname. Notable people with the surname include:
 Mirza Shokrallah Isfahani, 16th-century Iranian politician
 Nawaf Shukralla (born 1976), Bahraini football referee
 Hala Shukrallah (born 1954), Egyptian politician
 Hani Shukrallah (1950–2019), Egyptian journalist and political analyst

Arabic-language surnames
Surnames of Egyptian origin
Surnames of Bahraini origin